Tennis events were contested at the 1963 Summer Universiade in Porto Alegre, Brazil.

Medal summary

Medal table

See also
 Tennis at the Summer Universiade

External links
World University Games Tennis on HickokSports.com

1963
Universiade
1963 Summer Universiade